Events from the year 1825 in Canada.

Incumbents
Monarch: George IV

Federal government
Parliament of Lower Canada: 12th (starting January 8)
Parliament of Upper Canada: 9th (starting January 11)

Governors
Governor of the Canadas: Robert Milnes
Governor of New Brunswick: George Stracey Smyth
Governor of Nova Scotia: John Coape Sherbrooke
Commodore-Governor of Newfoundland: Thomas John Cochrane
Governor of Prince Edward Island: Charles Douglass Smith

Events
January 2 – The Parliament House, in Toronto, is burned.
June 27 – The Canada Company is founded
September 7 – Soldiers of the 70th Regiment subdue a fire, which consumes over eighty buildings, in Montreal.
September to October: The Great Miramichi Fire destroys at least 10 000 km ² to 20,000 km ² and killing at least 280 people.
October 26 – US finishes Erie Canal from Buffalo to Hudson River and New York City. It puts competitive pressure on Montreal and Toronto merchant elites to finish canals.
The Peter Robinson settlement brings 2,000 poor Irish families to Scott's Plains (now Peterborough, Ontario

Births
February 24 – Richard William Scott, politician and Minister (died 1913)
March 22 – Jane Mackenzie, second wife of Alexander Mackenzie, 2nd Prime Minister of Canada (died 1893)
March 24 – Joseph-Octave Beaubien, physician and politician (died 1877)
April 13 – D'Arcy McGee, journalist, politician and Father of Confederation, assassinated (died 1868)
May 25 – William Hallett Ray, politician, (died 1909)
May 29 – William Henry Pope, lawyer, politician, judge and a Father of Confederation (died 1879)
July 29 – Thomas McGreevy, politician and contractor (died 1897)
August 12 – Louis-Charles Boucher de Niverville, lawyer and politician (died 1869)
August 20 – Amor De Cosmos, journalist, politician and 2nd Premier of British Columbia (died 1897)

Full date unknown
Big Bear, Cree leader (died 1888)

Deaths

References 

 
Years of the 19th century in Canada
Canada
1825 in North America